Caputh may refer to the following places:

 Caputh, Brandenburg, a village in Brandenburg, Germany
 Caputh, Perth and Kinross, a village in Perth and Kinross, Scotland